Salsacate is a town in  Córdoba Province in Argentina, it is the head town of Pocho Department

External links

 Municipal website

Populated places in Córdoba Province, Argentina